Herrold Run (also known as Harrold Run) is a tributary of the Susquehanna River in Snyder County, Pennsylvania, in the United States. The stream is relatively small and the stream is crossed by at least one bridge. Two schools historically existed in the stream's vicinity. Its drainage basin is designated as a Warmwater Fishery and a Migratory Fishery.

Course
Herrold Run begins on a hill in Union Township. It flows southeast for a short distance before turning east-southeast and entering a valley. After several tenths of a mile, the stream turns southeast for several tenths of a mile. It then turns south-southeast, entering the census-designated place of Port Trevorton. A few tenths of a mile further downstream, the stream turns southeast, crossing US Route 11/US Route 15. It then continues in the same direction for a short distance before reaching its confluence with the Susquehanna River.

Geography and geology

Herrold Run is a relatively small stream.

Watershed and biology
The stream is entirely within the United States Geological Survey quadrangle of Dalmatia. Its mouth is located within  of Chapman.

A general store known as Hilsher's General Store is located in the vicinity of Herrold Run.

The drainage basin of Herrold Run is designated as a Warmwater Fishery and a Migratory Fishery.

History and name
Herrold Run was entered into the Geographic Names Information System on August 2, 1979. Its identifier in the Geographic Names Information System is 1176889. The stream is also known as Harrold Run. This variant name appears in a United States Geological Survey map.

In the late 1960s, civil engineer Stanley K. Hampsell found that although Herrold Run was referred to as "Harrold Run" on United States Geological Survey maps, locals have always spelled is as "Herrold Run", and never as "Harrold Run". He discovered official records at the Snyder County Courthouse referring to Herrold Run by name; these records dated to December 1864.

Historically, there were two schools in the vicinity of Herrold Run. They were known as the "Herrold Sch." and the "Upper Herrold School".

In May 2011, a $243,451 project to replace a bridge over Herrold Run with a box culvert and improve the adjacent road was begun. On July 7, 2011, the Pennsylvania Department of Transportation issued a statement saying that it would open the bridge the next day.

See also
Chapman Creek, next tributary of the Susquehanna River going downriver
Silver Creek (Susquehanna River), next tributary of the Susquehanna River going upriver
List of rivers of Pennsylvania

References

Rivers of Snyder County, Pennsylvania
Tributaries of the Susquehanna River
Rivers of Pennsylvania